This list is of the Cultural Properties of Japan designated in the category of  for the Prefecture of Miyagi.

National Cultural Properties
As of 1 August 2015, twenty Important Cultural Properties (including three *National Treasures) with forty-two component structures have been designated, being of national significance.

Prefectural Cultural Properties
As of 1 May 2014, thirty-six properties have been designated at a prefectural level.

Municipal Cultural Properties
As of 1 May 2014, one hundred and twenty properties have been designated at a municipal level.

Registered Cultural Properties
As of 1 August 2015, ninety-seven  properties at thirty-three sites have been registered (as opposed to designated) at a national level.

See also
 Cultural Properties of Japan
 National Treasures of Japan
 List of Historic Sites of Japan (Miyagi)
 List of Cultural Properties of Japan - paintings (Miyagi)

References

External links
  Cultural Properties in Miyagi Prefecture

Cultural Properties,Miyagi
Buildings and structures in Miyagi Prefecture
Miyagi
Structures,Miyagi